Bowen Forest in Mount Holly, Vermont, United States, is a component of the Yale Forests system. This system also includes the 7,800-acre (32 km²) Yale-Myers Forest located in the towns of Union, Ash-ford, East-ford, and Woodstock, CT, and the 1,100-acre (4.5 km²) Yale-Tourney Forest in the towns of Swanzey and Keene, NH. Bowen Forest is 462 acres (1.9 km²) in size, and like the other Yale Forests, is owned by Yale University and administered by the Yale School of Forestry & Environmental Studies. It was given to the university in 1922 by Elma S. Bowen in honor of her son, Joseph Brown Bowen, a 1917 graduate of the School of Forestry who was killed in France during World War I.

References 

Forests of Vermont
Yale University